The 2017 French Open described below in detail, in form of day-by-day summaries.

Day 1 (28 May)
Schedule of play

Seeds out:
Men's Singles:  Gilles Müller [26]
Women's Singles:  Angelique Kerber [1],  Mirjana Lučić-Baroni [22],  Roberta Vinci [31]

Day 2 (29 May)
Schedule of play

Seeds out:
Men's Singles:  Jack Sock [14],  Gilles Simon [31],  Mischa Zverev [32]
Women's Singles:  Coco Vandeweghe [19],  Daria Gavrilova [24],  Lauren Davis [25]

Day 3 (30 May)
Schedule of play

Seeds out:
Men's Singles:  Alexander Zverev [9],  Sam Querrey [27] 
Women's Singles:  Johanna Konta [7]
Men's Doubles:  Henri Kontinen /  John Peers [1],  Feliciano López /  Marc López [6],  Fabrice Martin /  Daniel Nestor [14]

Day 4 (31 May)
Ons Jabeur of Tunisia became the first Arab woman to reach the third round of Grand Slam upsetting Dominika Cibulková in straight sets.
Schedule of play

Seeds out:
Men's Singles:  Jo-Wilfried Tsonga [12],  Ivo Karlović [23]
Women's Singles:  Dominika Cibulková [6],  Petra Kvitová [15],  Kiki Bertens [18]
Men's Doubles:  Pierre-Hugues Herbert /  Nicolas Mahut [2],  Florin Mergea /  Aisam-ul-Haq Qureshi [13]
Women's Doubles:  Sania Mirza /  Yaroslava Shvedova [4],  Anna-Lena Grönefeld /  Květa Peschke [11]
Mixed Doubles:  Chan Yung-jan /  John Peers [1]

Day 5 (1 June)
Schedule of play

Seeds out:
Men's Singles:  Tomáš Berdych [13],  Nick Kyrgios [18],  David Ferrer [30]
Women's Singles:  Madison Keys [12],  Anastasia Pavlyuchenkova [16],  Barbora Strýcová [20],  Ana Konjuh [29]
Men's Doubles:  Raven Klaasen /  Rajeev Ram [8],  Pablo Carreño Busta /  Guillermo García López [10],  Marcin Matkowski /  Édouard Roger-Vasselin [12],  Oliver Marach /  Mate Pavić [15]
Women's Doubles:  Raquel Atawo /  Jeļena Ostapenko [10]

Day 6 (2 June)
Schedule of play

Seeds out:
Men's Singles:  David Goffin [10],  Grigor Dimitrov [11],  Lucas Pouille [16],  Steve Johnson [25]
Women's Singles:  Yulia Putintseva [27],  Zhang Shuai [32]
Men's Doubles:  Bob Bryan /  Mike Bryan [3],  Łukasz Kubot /  Marcelo Melo [4]
Women's Doubles:  Tímea Babos /  Andrea Hlaváčková [5],  Darija Jurak /  Anastasia Rodionova [17]
Mixed Doubles:  Jeļena Ostapenko /  Bruno Soares [8]

Day 7 (3 June)
Schedule of play

Seeds out:
Men's Singles:  Pablo Cuevas [22],  Fabio Fognini [28],  Juan Martín del Potro [29]
Women's Singles:  Agnieszka Radwańska [9],  Elena Vesnina [14],  Daria Kasatkina [26]
Men's Doubles:  Jean-Julien Rojer /  Horia Tecău [11]
Women's Doubles:  Abigail Spears /  Katarina Srebotnik [8],  Eri Hozumi /  Miyu Kato [18]
Mixed Doubles:  Yaroslava Shvedova /  Alexander Peya [5]

Day 8 (4 June)
Defending champion Garbiñe Muguruza lost to Kristina Mladenovic in the fourth round, ending her 10-match winning streak in Roland Garros. Former major champions Samantha Stosur, Svetlana Kuznetsova and Venus Williams were also eliminated in the fourth round.
Schedule of play

Seeds out:
Men's Singles:  Milos Raonic [5],  Roberto Bautista Agut [17],  Albert Ramos Viñolas [19],   John Isner [21],  Richard Gasquet [24]
Women's Singles:  Garbiñe Muguruza [4],  Svetlana Kuznetsova [8],  Venus Williams [10],  Anastasija Sevastova [17],  Samantha Stosur [23]
Men's Doubles:  Rohan Bopanna /  Pablo Cuevas [9]
Women's Doubles:  Gabriela Dabrowski /  Xu Yifan [9],  Kiki Bertens /  Johanna Larsson [13]
Mixed Doubles:  Katarina Srebotnik /  Raven Klaasen [4],  Chan Hao-ching /  Jean-Julien Rojer [6]

Day 9 (5 June)
Schedule of play

Seeds out:
Men's Singles:  Gaël Monfils [15]
Women's Singles:  Carla Suárez Navarro [21]
Men's Doubles:  Jamie Murray /  Bruno Soares [5]
Women's Doubles:  Chan Hao-ching /  Barbora Krejčíková [12],  Svetlana Kuznetsova /  Kristina Mladenovic [14],  Andreja Klepač /  María José Martínez Sánchez [15]
Mixed Doubles:  Sania Mirza /  Ivan Dodig [2]

Day 10 (6 June)
Play normally started at 14:00 CEST, match suspended at 15:30 due to heavy rain and resumed at 18:30.
Schedule of play

Seeds out:
Women's Singles:  Caroline Wozniacki [11],  Kristina Mladenovic [13]
Men's Doubles:  Ivan Dodig /  Marcel Granollers [7]

Day 11 (7 June)
Schedule of play

Seeds out:
Men's Singles:  Novak Djokovic [2],  Marin Čilić [7],  Kei Nishikori [8],  Pablo Carreño Busta [20]
Women's Singles:  Elina Svitolina [5],  Caroline Garcia [28]
Women's Doubles:  Ekaterina Makarova /  Elena Vesnina [2]
Mixed Doubles:  Andrea Hlaváčková /  Édouard Roger-Vasselin [3]

Day 12 (8 June)
Schedule of play

Seeds out:
Women's Singles:  Karolína Plíšková [2],  Timea Bacsinszky [30]

Day 13 (9 June)
Schedule of play

Seeds out:
Men's Singles:  Andy Murray [1],  Dominic Thiem [6]
Men's Doubles:  Juan Sebastián Cabal /  Robert Farah [16]
Women's Doubles:  Chan Yung-jan /  Martina Hingis [3],  Lucie Hradecká /  Kateřina Siniaková [6]

Day 14 (10 June)
Jeļena Ostapenko became the first Latvian player (male or female) to win a major title and the first unseeded female player since Margaret Scriven in 1933. She also claimed her first ever WTA title by winning the tournament.		
Schedule of play

Seeds out: 
Women's Singles:  Simona Halep [3]

Day 15 (11 June)
Rafael Nadal became the first male player to win 10 major singles titles in a single Grand Slam event, equally tying Björn Borg's overall men's Grand Slam record without losing a set. He surpassed Pete Sampras' 14 major titles, now second behind Roger Federer.
Schedule of play

Seeds out:
Men's Singles:  Stan Wawrinka [3]

References

Day-by-day summaries
French Open by year – Day-by-day summaries